The men's 100 meter running deer, single shots was a shooting sports event held as part of the Shooting at the 1924 Summer Olympics programme. It was the fifth appearance of the event. The competition was held on 30 June 1924 at the shooting ranges at Versailles. 32 shooters from 8 nations competed.

Results

A maximum of four competitors per nation were allowed. Every shooter fired 10 shots with points from 0 to 5 (5 was the best) so a maximum of 50 points was possible.

References

External links
 Official Report
 

Shooting at the 1924 Summer Olympics
100 meter running deer at the Olympics